The Vancouver 36 is an American sailboat that was designed by Robert B. Harris as a  bluewater ocean cruiser and first built in 1977.

This boat design is often confused with the later and unrelated Tony Taylore-designed  Vancouver 36 sailboat, which was built in the United Kingdom by Northshore Yachts, starting in 1989. The Harris design is usually appended with his name to differentiate it from the other design.

Production
The design was built by Durbeck's Inc in Sarasota, Florida, United States, starting in 1977, until they went out of business in 1983. Hidden Harbor Boatworks, also in Sarasota, then produced the design until they too went out of business a few years later, in the late 1980s, ending production. A total of 13 boats were built.

Boats were factory-produced in three states of completion. Some were delivered to customers by road, as kits with the hull and deck joined. Some were delivered wit engines installed, so they could be motored home from the factory, while the majority were delivered complete, with interiors and ready-to-sail.

Design
The Vancouver 36 is a recreational keelboat, built predominantly of fiberglass, with minimal teak wood trim above decks. It has a cutter rig with aluminum spars, a raked stem, a canoe transom, a keel-mounted rudder controlled by a wheel and a fixed modified long keel, with a cutaway foot. It displaces  and carries  of ballast. A pilot house version was introduced in 1987.

Reviewer Richard Jordan described the engine in this application as "woefully underpowered".

The design could be a completed with a number or different cabin plans. A typical one includes a large bow stateroom, with a double berth on the port side, a workbench on the port side, a large ensuite head with a shower. A settee berth to port and a pilot berth on the starboard side are provided in the main cabin for total sleeping accommodation for four people. The galley is to starboard aft, at the foot of the companionway way steps, and includes a three-burner stove and a  icebox. A navigation station is provided to port. Unusually this cabin layout includes a fireplace. The bow has an anchor chain locker and a large sail locker. Aft of the companionway steps are a large sail locker, a wet locker and the engine compartment. The cabin sole is made from 

Ventilation is provided by four deck hatches, plus two cowl vents.

The cockpit is small and seats four people, to make more room below decks. The mainsheet traveler is located on the cabin roof, sheeting mid-boom. The shrouds are mounted inboard and the genoa is sheeted outboard, at the toe-rail.

Operational history
In a review Richard Sherwood wrote, "Robert Harris also designed the Vancouver 27, 32, and 42, but
the first two are produced in England and the latter in Taiwan. The 36 has an unusual cabin layout. With a large space but only four bunks, she is designed for long-range cruising. Entry is fine,
bilges are hard, and the maximum beam is well aft. Ballast/displacement ratio is 42 percent."

In a 2009 review Richard Jordan wrote, "this is a no nonsense tank – a boat that is meant to go places. Just slip the dock lines and head for the horizon … The 36 like her sisters is a bluewater cruiser, heavy and strong. She has a classic cruising look – a powerfully straight raked bow and canoe stern. Her lines are modest with a subtle sheer. Most notable in look is her stepped cabin trunk similar to the pilothouse deck mold of her 42-foot sistership and perforated aluminum toe rail. Her stern is thick and full bodied and not for everyone."

See also
List of sailing boat types

Similar sailboats
Bayfield 36
C&C 36-1
C&C 36R
Catalina 36
Columbia 36
Crealock 37
CS 36
Ericson 36
Frigate 36
Hunter 36
Invader 36
Nonsuch 36
Portman 36
S2 11.0
Seidelmann 37
Watkins 36
Watkins 36C

References

Keelboats
1970s sailboat type designs
Sailing yachts
Sailboat type designs by Robert B. Harris
Sailboat types built by Durbeck's Inc
Sailboat types built by Hidden Harbor Boatworks